Bruno Becker da Silva (born 17 November 1990) is a Brazilian Paralympic swimmer who competes at international swimming competitions, he was born without his right arm and his legs are impaired. He is a triple Parapan American Games bronze medalist in freestyle swimming. He competed at the 2020 Summer Paralympics and became the first athlete from Rio do Sul to win a medal at the Parapan American Games and compete at the Paralympic Games.

Inspiration
Becker began training to swim after his younger brother Marcelo drowned in a waterfall in Atalanta at the age of thirteen. Bruno described his brother as an inspiration, motivating and "would be his right arm" which Bruno was born without.

References

1990 births
Living people
Sportspeople from Curitiba
Paralympic swimmers of Brazil
Brazilian male freestyle swimmers
Swimmers at the 2020 Summer Paralympics
Medalists at the 2019 Parapan American Games
S2-classified Paralympic swimmers